Giuseppe Oldani (born 15 July 1904, date of death unknown) was an Italian boxer who competed in the 1924 Summer Olympics. He was born in Milan. In 1924 he was eliminated in the second round of the welterweight class after losing his fight to the upcoming bronze medalist Douglas Lewis.

References

External links

1904 births
Year of death missing
Welterweight boxers
Olympic boxers of Italy
Boxers at the 1924 Summer Olympics
Boxers from Milan
Italian male boxers
20th-century Italian people